35 Cancri is a star in the zodiac constellation of Cancer, located 630 light years from the Sun. It is a challenge to view with the naked eye even under good seeing conditions, having an apparent visual magnitude of +6.55. The star is moving further from the Earth with a heliocentric radial velocity of +35 km/s, and is a member of the Beehive Cluster.

This is a subgiant star with a stellar classification of G0 III. It is rotating at a relatively fast clip, giving it an oblate shape with an equatorial bulge that is 5% larger than the polar radius. 35 Cancri has a projected rotational velocity of 99 km/s and a rotation period of 0.5 days. This rotation is expected to decrease significantly as the star expands into a giant. It has nearly the same mass and size as the Sun, but is radiating 77 times the Sun's luminosity from its photosphere at an effective temperature of 5,950 K.

References

G-type giants
Subgiant stars
Cancer (constellation)
Durchmusterung objects
Cancri, 35
072779
042133
3387